Casa de muñecos is a Chilean telenovela created by Nona Fernández and Marcelo Leonart, that premiered on Mega on August 20, 2018 and ended on March 11, 2019. It stars Gabriela Hernández, Héctor Noguera, Sigrid Alegría, Luz Valdivieso, Celine Reymond and Daniela Ramírez.

Premise 
The telenovela revolves around the Falco sisters, who learn that their mother, Nora, has abandoned their father after more than 50 years of marriage. This event leads them to question the apparent happiness and stability in their own lives and undertake a search for true happiness. What they ignore is that Nora suffers from Alzheimer's disease and her drastic decision is only a desperate attempt to live to the fullest the days of lucidity she has left.

Cast 
 Gabriela Hernández as Nora Elizalde
 Héctor Noguera as Sergio Falco
 Sigrid Alegría as Leonor Falco
 Luz Valdivieso as Mónica Falco
 Celine Reymond as Isabella Falco
 Daniela Ramírez as Alejandra Falco
 Alejandro Goic as Federico Andrade
 Álvaro Morales as Jose Luis Hurtado
 Diego Muñoz as Santiago Balladares
 Paulo Brunetti as Octavio Sepúlveda
 Cristián Riquelme as Rodrigo Hormazábal
 Santiago Meneghello as Mauro Torres
 Teresa Münchmeyer as Gracia Galindo
 Amalia Kassai as Almendra Sepúlveda
 Ignacio Massa as Matías Andrade
 Catalina Stuardo as Ágata Balladares
 Clemente Rodríguez as Julián Hurtado
 Antonia Mujica as Constanza Hurtado
 Emilia Echavarría as Fabiola Valdivia
 Sebastián Sarralde as Sebastián Balladares
 Hellen Mrugalski as Natalia Hormazábal
 Jaime Vadell as Rodolfo Marín
 Coca Rudolphy as Pochi Peralta
 Julio Jung Duvauchelle as Patricio Aliaga
 Ingrid Isensee as Susana Estévez
 Muriel Martin as Claudia
 Pelusa Troncoso as Jazmín Quispe
 Camila Leyva as Martita Rojas
 Luz María Yacometti as Lucy Tapia
 Diego Gougain as Polo

Ratings

References

External links 
 

2018 Chilean television series debuts
2019 Chilean television series endings
2018 telenovelas
Chilean telenovelas
Mega (Chilean TV channel) telenovelas
Spanish-language telenovelas